Serra das Araras Ecological Station is an ecological station in Mato Grosso, Brazil.
It contains a sample of the Cerrado biome.

Location

It is administered by the Chico Mendes Institute for Biodiversity Conservation.
It covers parts of the Cáceres and Porto Estrela municipalities of Mato Grosso.

Environment

The ecological station contains an area of the Cerrado biome and lies in the corridor linking the Amazon and Pantanal regions.
It is in an area of parallel mountain ranges that forms the watershed between the Cuiabá and Paraguay rivers in the Parana river basin, and the Arinos and Teles Pires rivers of the Amazon basin.
The Salobro River, a left tributary of the Paraguay River, is formed in the station by the confluence of the Camarinha, Miranda, Pedro, Ribeirão, Salobinha and Três Ribeirões streams, which start in the station, and the Cajurú, Córrego Velho, Fundo, Quilombo and  Pacova do Eugênio, which start outside the station.

Conservation

The reserve is classified as International Union for Conservation of Nature (IUCN) category Ia (strict nature reserve).
The purpose is to preserve nature and support scientific research.
The endangered White-cheeked spider monkey (Ateles marginatus) and critically endangered blue-eyed ground dove (Columbina cyanopis) is protected in the reserve.

Notes

Sources

1982 establishments in Brazil
Ecological stations of Brazil
Protected areas of Mato Grosso
Protected areas established in 1982